CKUT-FM is the official campus community radio station of McGill University. It can be heard at 90.3 FM in Montreal. CKUT's FM signal, broadcast from a tower on the top of Mount Royal, reaches as far as the Eastern Townships and upstate New York.  CKUT is consistently voted as the Best Radio Station in The Montreal Mirror's, "Cult Montreal" Best of Montreal Readers Poll.

CKUT's programming is produced by more than 300 volunteers who are McGill students and members of the community. The station also employs a handful of full-time and part-time coordinators. The station's format is freeform in that each programmer is responsible for choosing music without regard to commercial interests.

A great variety of music and spoken-word shows are broadcast daily in a multiplicity of languages, including English, French, Spanish, Korean, Hindi, and Haitian Creole.

Special programming initiatives include The Truth About Columbus, Feminist Frequencies, Radio Art Celebrations and Experimentations, and The Homelessness Marathon, an event which CKUT established and has hosted annually since 2002, during which CKUT broadcasts for fourteen hours, from dusk until dawn, to engage with homelessness in Canada live and direct from the streets of Montreal.

CKUT-FM started broadcasting on November 16, 1987.

Programs

Shows Currently On The Air 
Among CKUT's many programs are:

Bluegrass Ramblings, established by Ross Harvey; formerly hosted by Adam Schwarzenberg; currently hosted by Dara Weiss
Country Classics Hour, established by Ross Harvey; currently hosted by Little Andy, Katie Moore, and Julia Kater
Dromotexte, hosted by Fortner Anderson
Dykes on Mykes, hosted by Shannon Herrick
The Free Kick Radio Show, hosted by Clara-Swan Kennedy
Folk Directions, hosted by Gerry Goodfriend
Grey Matters, hosted by Fortner Anderson
Jazz Amuck hosted by john b since 1986 
International Radio Report, on CKUT weekly since November 19, 1987, currently co-hosted and co-produced by Sheldon Harvey & Gilles Letourneau
Latin Time - Tiempo Latino, hosted by Sergio Martinez
LegalEase, hosted by a collective of McGill law students
Macondo & El Club de los Feos, hosted by Juan-Carlos Quintana, DJ Irwin Franco, and Diego Puente "El Farandulero"
New Shit, a collective program hosted by the Music Department
Off The Hook, hosted by DJ Buddablaze, Revolution and Flow
Off The Hour, hosted by the Community News Collective
Positive Vibes: hosted by Johnny Black, Roger Moore and Nadine, airing since 1986
Roots, Rock and Reggae, hosted by Fluxy, Singing P, and Mr. Boom, airing since 1996
Samedi Midi, hosted by Raymond Laurent
Spitfiyah! Women of Colour Radio
The Tuesday Morning After, hosted by Scott Erik, Elena Razlogova & Oz Cohen
The Friday Morning After, hosted by Craig Sauve, Josh Hind, Ken McMurray and Amie Watson
The Weekend Groove, created by RonniLov hosted by Mikey Don, Everton Green 
Underground Sounds, hosted by Nick Schofield
Voice of Korea
WeFunk, hosted by Professor Groove and DJ Static
West Indian Rhythms, hosted by Howard "Stretch" Carr & Faithlyn Sankar
William Shatner's Whiskey Tears, hosted by the enigmatic and mysterious "Gary", along with a collective of McGill students and alumni

Underground Sounds 

Underground Sounds broadcasts Montreal music on CKUT Mondays 8-10pm, and has been airing since 1987. Host Nick Schofield features new music from emerging artists, focusing on upcoming concerts and album releases through interviews, live performances and playlists. In 2014, Cult Montreal readers voted Schofield #1 Radio Host and Underground Sounds #1 Radio Show in Montreal.

Voice of Korea 

Voice of Korea  (not to be confused with the North Korean shortwave radio service of same name) is an hour-long program broadcast every Tuesday at 2PM. Entirely created by volunteers composed of 1st and 2nd-generation Koreans as well as other Asians, Voice of Korea features content for both the local Korean community and local residents through its bilingual (English and Korean) programming. Each show contains International News, Local Korean Community News, Weekly Event Calendar, Korean Movie Preview, Korean Culture Feature Story, Language Exchange for learning Korean and French and Top 5 Korean movies and songs for the week.

Dykes on Mykes 

Dykes on Mykes  was founded in 1987 to produce media that would both represent the diversity of the lesbian community, and would provide the opportunity for these communities to critically examine pertinent political and cultural issues. The show takes place bi-weekly in English.

Macondo & el Club de los Feos 

Macondo & el Club de los Feos "Macondo & El Club de los Feos" is a two-hour show that plays Latin music, Salsa, merengue Bachata and Ballads. Show in English, French and Spanish. 
The Show is divided in 4 segments: El set de Salsa Clásica pal que sabe y el que no que aprenda / El Haha Mix, Las novedades / La Pausa Cuchi Cuchi / Aqui mando yo (we play what you want)

Positive Vibes 
One of the longest running shows on CKUT, originated by Janice Dayle “J.D”, in 1986 (pre-FM licence) and arguably, opening the door to other Caribbean, Afro-centric programmes. It has had various other hosts over the years including Sistah P (Pat Dillon, currently host of Bhum Bhum Time) Prym Tyme, and Majesty. The current hosts are Johnny Black, Roger Moore and Nadine. Montreal’s reggae matrix, they play all forms of reggae, roots, rub a dub, ska, dancehall, vintage, rarities and keep reggae lovers informed of all the events happening in Montreal.

International Radio Report 
On the air since Thursday, November 19, 1987, the 30-minute show featuring news and information on all aspects of radio, radio broadcasting, and communications, locally, nationally and internationally, is one of only a few shows to have been on CKUT continually since CKUT obtained its FM license and began broadcasting on 90.3 FM on Movember 16, 1987.  The show was created by Sheldon Harvey, who continues to co-host and co-produce to this day, with current co-host Gilles Letourneau.  The crew on the show has changed from time to time over the years, including Bill Westenhaver, Richard Casavant, Janice Laws, Steve Karlock, and David Asselin. International Radio Report originally aired on Thursday afternoons at 2:30, but after several years moved to the Sunday morning, 10:30 am time slot. The show has a Facebook Group with over 800 members. The fairly recent addition of a YouTube channel, now with over 700 subscribers, allows everyone the opportunity to tune in and listen to editions of the program on their own time schedule.

Past Shows No Longer On The Air 

AACK!!, hosted by Lorrie Edmonds (on air 1988-2013)
Dobbin's Den, hosted by Len Dobbin
Eugene Weems Presents, hosted by Eugene Edgar Weems (CFRM era)
Movement Museum, hosted by Chris 'Zeke' Hand, Finn Upham and Jon Crellin.
No I'm Iron Man, hosted by Dan Maxham and Matthew Maxham
Caravan, hosted by Samaa Elibyari
Native Solidarity News, hosted by the Native Solidarity News Collective
Roots Rock Rebel, hosted by Aaron Lakoff
Sigaw ng Bayan MTL, hosted by the Sigaw ng Bayan Radio Collective
Where's the Beat?, hosted by Eliot Handelman with Andie Sigler, and Aj
Your Radio is Broken, hosted by Dj Melon and Rhys Taylor

Roots Rock Rebel 

Roots Rock Rebel was a weekly music program hosted by Aaron Lakoff, which featured ska, reggae, soul, and punk music. The show began in an overnight time-slot in 2003 under the name "Rude Rude Radio", and moved into its time slot in January 2006 under the name "Roots Rock Rebel". Some of the legendary ska and reggae artists who have been interviewed on Roots Rock Rebel include Lynn Taitt of The Skatalites, Pauline Black of The Selecter, and Hopeton Lewis, who is often credited as the originator of the rocksteady genre. The program aired Wednesday nights from 10pm-12am between 2006 and 2015, at which point it became The Rebel Beat, also hosted by Lakoff.

References 

Decision CRTC 87-189

External links
 Official website
 
 

Kut
Kut
McGill University
Radio stations established in 1987
Kut
1987 establishments in Quebec